UHQCD The First Best Selection '87~'92 is a compilation album by Japanese singer/songwriter Chisato Moritaka, released on November 25, 2015 by Warner Music Japan. The album compiles a selection of Moritaka's singles from 1987 to 1992 in Ultimate High Quality Compact Disc (UHQCD) format. It was released simultaneously with zetima's UHQCD The First Best Selection '93~'99.

The album peaked at No. 103 on Oricon's albums chart.

Track listing 
All lyrics are written by Chisato Moritaka, except where indicated; all music is composed and arranged by Hideo Saitō, except where indicated.

Charts

References

External links 
  (Chisato Moritaka)
  (Warner Music Japan)
 

2015 compilation albums
Chisato Moritaka compilation albums
Japanese-language compilation albums
Warner Music Japan compilation albums